Saint Mark, or Mark the Evangelist, is the traditional author of the Gospel of Mark.

Saint Mark may also refer to:
Pope Mark (died 336), Pope from January 18 to October 7, 336
Sts. Mark and Marcellian (died c. 286), martyrs venerated as saints
St.  (died c. 328), a Catholic bishop commemorated on November 5
St. Mark Ji Tianxiang (died 1900), one of the Martyr Saints of China
St. Mark Coptic Orthodox Church (Jersey City, New Jersey), U.S.
St. Mark Coptic Orthodox Church (Los Angeles), California, U.S.
Saint Mark, a statue by Donatello
Saint Mark Parish, Dominica
Saint Mark Parish, Grenada

See also
St. Mark's (disambiguation)
Saint-Marc (disambiguation)
San Marco (disambiguation)
Sveti Marko (disambiguation)

Mark